Revenant is an original novel based on the U.S. television series Buffy the Vampire Slayer.

Plot summary

A Chinese gang arrives in Sunnydale, which begins committing criminal acts across the town. Immediately, racial tension begins to increase; one of Willow's friends, Jia Li, is especially subjected to the effects. She discovers that her brother, Lok, is delving into the occult, in order to learn more about their great-grandfather's death in Sunnydale many years prior. Coinciding with these events, a man named Zhiyong tries to resurrect some men who died in a cave many years prior in order to raise Sharmma, a demon who would give him power in return. A beautiful warrior named Shing arrives on the scene at the same time; apparently, she's just as strong as Buffy. Xander feels an immediate attraction for her, but there's something about her that he doesn't know.

Continuity

The novel is placed during late Buffy season 3. Wesley and Faith do not appear.

Canonical issues

Buffy novels such as this one are not usually considered by fans as canonical. Some fans consider them as stories from the imaginations of authors and artists, while other fans consider them as taking place in an alternative fictional reality. However, unlike fan fiction, overviews created early in the writing process which summarized the story were 'approved' by both Fox and Joss Whedon (or his office), and the books were therefore later published as official Buffy merchandise.

External links

Reviews
Litefoot1969.bravepages.com - Review of this book by Litefoot
Teen-books.com - Reviews of this book
Nika-summers.com - Review of this book by Nika Summers

2001 American novels
Books based on Buffy the Vampire Slayer
Novels by Mel Odom